In the quantum mechanics study of optical phase space,  the displacement operator for one mode is the shift operator  in quantum optics,
,

The name of this operator is derived from its ability to displace a localized state in phase space by a magnitude . It may also act on the vacuum state by displacing it into a coherent state. Specifically,
 where  is a coherent state, which is an eigenstate of the annihilation (lowering) operator.

Properties 
The displacement operator is a unitary operator, and therefore obeys
,
where  is the identity operator. Since , the hermitian conjugate of the displacement operator can also be interpreted as a displacement of opposite magnitude. The effect of applying this operator in a similarity transformation of the ladder operators results in their displacement.

The product of two displacement operators is another displacement operator whose total displacement, up to a phase factor, is the sum of the two individual displacements. This can be seen by utilizing the Baker–Campbell–Hausdorff formula.

which shows us that:

When acting on an eigenket, the phase factor  appears in each term of the resulting state, which makes it physically irrelevant.

It further leads to the braiding relation

Alternative expressions 
The Kermack-McCrae identity gives two alternative ways to express the displacement operator:

Multimode displacement 
The displacement operator can also be generalized to multimode displacement. A multimode creation operator can be defined as

,

Using this definition, we can write the multimode displacement operator as

,

and define the multimode coherent state as

.

See also

 Optical phase space

References

Quantum optics